Guglielmo della Scala (died 1404) was the son of Cangrande II della Scala. He assassinated his father in 1359, but was edged out of power by his uncle Cansignorio.

In 1404, together with his two sons Brunoro and Antonio II, he led a revolt against the Milanese. He was proclaimed Lord of Verona on 17 April, but was expelled from the city by the populace on 28 April. Francesco da Carrara, Lord of Padua, took over in the city a few days later.

By his marriage to Onesta Mortone, Guglielmo left the two aforementioned sons, who never regained power in Verona, and three younger sons: Bartolomeo (died 21 March 1453), Fregnano (died 4 December 1443 at Vienna), Nicodemus, and Paul.

Scaliger, Guglielmo
Scaliger, Guglielmo
Guglielmo
Lords of Verona